The Last of the Six (French: Le dernier des six) is a 1941 French mystery thriller film directed by Georges Lacombe and starring Pierre Fresnay, Michèle Alfa and Suzy Delair.  It was shot at the Billancourt Studios in Paris. The film's sets were designed by the art director Andrej Andrejew. It is based on the 1931 novel The Six Dead Men by the Belgian writer Stanislas-André Steeman. 

The film was made in Occupied France by the German-backed Continental Films, with the screenplay by  Henri-Georges Clouzot who headed the company's scenario department. It was followed by a sequel in 1942 The Murderer Lives at Number 21 directed by Clouzot, with Fresnay and Delair reprising their roles.

Cast
 Pierre Fresnay as Le commissaire Wensceslas Voroboevitch dit Monsieur Wens
 Michèle Alfa as 	Lolita Gernicot
 Suzy Delair as Mila Malou - une chanteuse de cabaret, la maîtresse gouailleuse de Wens
 Jean Tissier as 	Henri Tignol
 André Luguet as 	Henri Senterre
 Jean Chevrier as 	Jean Perlonjour
 Lucien Nat as Marcel Gernicot
 Georges Rollin as 	Georges Gribbe dit Jo
 Raymond Segard as Namotte
 Odette Barencey as Pâquerette 
 Henri Bargin as 	Un homme 
 Jacques Beauvais as Le maître d'hôtel
 Rivers Cadet as Un inspecteur 
 Martine Carol as 	Une femme
 Paul Demange as Fabien - le maître d'hôtel de Senterre 
 Pierre Labry as 	L'inspecteur Picard 
 Roger Legris as Le photographe 
 Albert Malbert as Le patron du garni 
 Marcel Maupi as Le régisseur 
 Robert Ozanne as L'inspecteur Dallandier 
 Maurice Salabert as 	Un inspecteur 
 Robert Vattier as 	L'administrateur
 Frank Villard as	Un homme 
 Charles Vissières as Le concierge

References

Bibliography 
 Goble, Alan. The Complete Index to Literary Sources in Film. Walter de Gruyter, 1999.
 Hayward, Susan. Les Diaboliques (Henri-Georges Clouzot, 1955). University of Illinois Press, 2005.
 Mayne, Judith. Le Corbeau: (Henri-Georges Clouzot, 1943). University of Illinois Press, 2007.

External links 
 

1941 films
French drama films
1941 drama films
1940s thriller films
French thriller films
1940s French-language films
Films directed by Georges Lacombe
French black-and-white films
Films set in Paris
Films based on Belgian novels
1940s French films
Films based on works by Stanislas-André Steeman